Gushmir (also Romanized as Gushmīr; also known as Chāh-e Gushmīr and Chāh-i-Gushmīr) is a village in Dokuheh Rural District, Seh Qaleh District, Sarayan County, South Khorasan Province, Iran. At the 2006 census, its population was 114, in 29 families.

References 

Populated places in Sarayan County